Michel Hayek (Arabic: ميشال حايك) is a Lebanese psychic and clairvoyant, who created a lot of controversies through his traditional yearly New Year's Eve's television predictions appearances, which started on the LBC, and later MTV. Some have called him Nostradamus of the Middle-East.

Biography 
Born in 1967 at Beit Chabab to a butcher, as a child he predicted about his family and friends but was not taken seriously. 

He started working in the field of predictions in 1985, and traveled around the world for 13 years, drawing the attention of the media and newspapers, but it was with the launch of Arab satellite televisions that became famous.

He does not offer his prediction services to ordinary people, but only to politicians and international firms like in the United States, Britain and Australia. He has built relationships with the Lebanese politicians, and he claimed that over 35 percent of politicians resort to fortunetelling.

He is a businessman with investments in many areas such as real estate.

His predictions 
 In 2006 he did not make any predictions, because of his notoriety growing so much in the country.
 In 2020 he predicted the horrific Beirut Port explosion, by saying he pictured fire, ash and smoke at the port of Beirut. 
 In 2021 he predicted akkar explosion

Skepticism 
The skeptics see that his work depends on coincidence and they say that the Arab Spring event was not mentioned in his predictions except in small talks that did not match the strength of the event, and that his error rate is very large and his forecasts are very generic and abstract in many cases, which could be applied to any event that happens. KATA

References

External links 

Psychics
Clairvoyants
1967 births
Living people